Eivin Kristensen (born 6 February 1926) is a Danish rower. He competed at the 1952 Summer Olympics in Helsinki with the men's coxed four where they were eliminated in the semi-final repêchage.

References

External links
  

1926 births
Possibly living people 
Danish male rowers
Olympic rowers of Denmark
Rowers at the 1952 Summer Olympics
Sportspeople from Aarhus
European Rowing Championships medalists